Nguyễn Lộc (Thạch Thất district, 8 April 1912 –  4 April 1960) was a Vietnamese martial arts teacher. He was the founder of Vovinam (Việt Võ Đạo).

Grandmaster Lộc was born in Hữu Bằng village, Thạch Thất district, then part of Sơn Tây province, now a district of Hanoi. He was the eldest of five children of Nguyễn Dinh Xuyen and Nguyễn Thị Hoa.

In his younger years he trained in traditional Vietnamese martial arts. In 1938, grandmaster Nguyễn introduced his style "Vovinam" to the public. After a demonstration in 1939 in Hanoi, Vovinam quickly spread across the country, and internationally to the Vietnamese diaspora via France. However the French banned the movement in 1942.

In 1946 when Vietnam became officially at war with the French Lộc organised his students in resistance in the Hanoi area, but a disagreement with the Viet Minh led to him disbanding his group and retreating to his home village. He emigrated to South Vietnam in the 1950s.

After grandmaster Nguyễn's death in 1960, His senior student, Grandmaster Lê Sáng continued the development and international promotion of Vovinam until his own death on September 27, 2010.

References

1912 births
1960 deaths
Vietnamese martial artists
Sportspeople from Hanoi